A  is a Japanese headband, usually made of red or white cloth, typically featuring a design of kanji at the front. It is worn as a symbol of effort or courage by the wearer, especially by those in the military, or to simply keep sweat off one's face.

History 
The most common theory states that they originated as headbands worn by samurai, worn underneath armour to stop cuts from their helmets and to make wearing their helmets more comfortable.

Kamikaze pilots wore  before flying to their deaths.

Styles

They are also typically decorated with the rising sun motif, usually in the center of the headband.

Common slogans
Some common slogans include:

Gallery

See also

References

Japanese words and phrases
Japanese headgear
Headgear